Dead History is a typeface which explores combining structural elements of both geometric sans-serif and Didone serif typefaces.

History 
The Dead history typeface was designed in 1990 by P. Scott Makela and is licensed by Emigre. While Makela studied in the design program at Cranbook, he used a digital process to create Dead History as opposed to Phototypesetting. With his computer, he combined elements of both the VAG Rounded and Bell Centennial to create Dead History. The typeface went through a few more edits before being licensed by Emigre in 1994. In 2011, The Museum of Modern Art in New York added Dead History to its architecture and design collection.

Characteristics 
Dead History’s strokes transition from unbracketed serifs and contrasting stroke width on the left side of characters to a mono-weighted sans-serif with soft, rounded terminals on the right. This typeface is most often associated with postmodern ideals from the time.

References
Friedl, Frederich, Nicholas Ott and Bernard Stein. Typography: An Encyclopedic Survey of Type Design and Techniques Through History. Black Dog & Leventhal: 1998. .
Macmillan, Neil. An A–Z of Type Designers. Yale University Press: 2006. .

External links
Emigre’s web page for Dead History

Emigre typefaces
Semi-serif typefaces
Typefaces and fonts introduced in 1990
Display typefaces